Anny Rüegg-Hardmeier (1912 – 1 May 2011) was a Swiss alpine skier and world champion. She was born in Chur.

Rüegg won a gold medal at the 1934 World Championships in St. Moritz, winning the Downhill event, and a gold medal in slalom at the 1935 World Championships in Mürren.

References

1912 births
2011 deaths
People from Chur
Swiss female alpine skiers
Olympic alpine skiers of Switzerland
Alpine skiers at the 1936 Winter Olympics
Sportspeople from Graubünden
20th-century Swiss women